Santa Rosa is a  department of Catamarca Province in Argentina.

External links
Santa Rosa Webpage (Spanish)

Populated places established in 1981
Departments of Catamarca Province